Stephen Simmons House is a historic home located at Hounsfield in Jefferson County, New York. The farmhouse was built about 1818 and consists of a -story main block and an original 1-story rear wing, with a modern 1-story wood-frame garage attached to the wing.  The walls are of roughly dressed local ashlar limestone laid in even courses and trimmed with smoothly dressed limestone.

It was listed on the National Register of Historic Places in 1989.

References

Houses on the National Register of Historic Places in New York (state)
Houses completed in 1818
Houses in Jefferson County, New York
National Register of Historic Places in Jefferson County, New York